Jaycar, formerly Jaycar Electronics, is an Australia-based retailer dealing in electronic components and related products for electronics enthusiasts. The company owns around 110 stores across Australia and New Zealand, and also sells its products online in the UK and US. It was founded in 1981 by Gary Johnston, who remained managing director until his death in 2021.

The company also has a wholesale arm, Electus Distribution.

History
Jaycar was founded when Gary Johnston, a former Dick Smith Electronics employee, purchased John Carr & Co. Pty Ltd. He became managing director of the company.

In 2005, Jaycar received negative attention from its imported Taiwanese "Choke-A-Chicken" toy that squawked and flapped its wings when strangled around its neck, described by the RSPCA Queensland as "grossly irresponsible".

In October 2012, remarks made by Johnston on Sydney radio station 2GB, seen as providing justification for sexist behaviour by unidentified staff at the Canterbury-Bankstown NRL club (Bulldogs), of which Jaycar was a major sponsor at the time, caused controversy. There were calls to boycott Jaycar stores.

In October 2016, Freetronics owner Jonathan Oxer accused Jaycar of copying his business' Open Source Arduino Experimenters kit in two videos posted to his YouTube channel.

In September 2018 Johnston ended Jaycar's sponsorship of the Bulldogs, following questionable behaviour from players during Mad Monday celebrations.

Johnston died on 10 March 2021, after being diagnosed with mesothelioma two weeks earlier.

Description

, Jaycar has over 110 stores across Australian and New Zealand, and more than 170 authorised stockists and agents that carry Jaycar products. The group also owns a number of Road Tech Marine stores.

Electus Distribution is Jaycar's wholesale arm, which operates as a separate company and provides products to independent and other retailers as well as and original equipment manufacturers in Australia and New Zealand.

Community involvement

Jaycar became a major sponsor of NRL club Canterbury-Bankstown Bulldogs in 2009, but questionable behaviour from players led Johnston to end the partnership in September 2018. Jaycar sponsors Warby Motorsport and a number of local sports teams. Jaycar has sponsored the Western Suburbs Magpies rugby league team, based in western Sydney, since 2019. Johnston had been a "lifelong supporter".

The company has supported or hosted maker culture events, and supports several charities, including:
Starlight Children's Foundation
Charlie Teo Foundation
Operation Restore Hope
FSHD Global Research Foundation
Steve Waugh Foundation
Exodus Foundation
Save our Sons

See also
Jaycar Sunswift III
Element-14 / Farnell

References

External links

Australian companies established in 1981
Consumer electronics retailers of Australia
Companies based in Sydney
1981 establishments in Australia
Retail companies established in 1981